Wideford Hill chambered cairn is a Neolithic chambered cairn on Mainland, Orkney in Scotland. The tomb dates to around 2000 BC, and is similar in design to the Maeshowe chambered cairn on Orkney. Historic Environment Scotland established the site as a scheduled monument in 1994.

Description
The chambered cairn is located near Kirkwall on Mainland, Orkney in Scotland. It is similar in design to the Maeshowe burial monument, also located on Mainland, Orkney. The visible masonry shows the different construction stages of the Neolithic cairn with its three concentric walls built on an earthen platform. The monument has a stepped facade, but the original shape was probably rounded or conical, with the stonework covered in clay and turf.

The monument was constructed on a steep slope and its entrance is on the west side. The entrance passage is low and narrow and takes up one third of the entire passage and is somewhat curved. The inner passage, which is cut into the hill, is covered with lintel slabs and leads to a rectangular stone-lined chamber and three side chambers. The side chambers are corbelled. Entry to the tomb now is through a reconstructed concrete roof, completed during the 20th century.

History
The tomb dates from the Neolithic era, approximately 2,000 BC. The site was excavated in the 1840s by Flinders Petrie. He did not uncover any human remains or other finds at the time and suggested that the burial monument had been filled with rubble and abandoned. The main chamber had been previously filled with rubble. Historic Environment Scotland established the site as a scheduled monument in 1994.

See also
Cuween Hill Chambered Cairn
Huntersquoy chambered cairn
Vinquoy chambered cairn

References

Archaeological sites in Orkney
Prehistoric Orkney
Scheduled monuments in Scotland
Chambered cairns in Scotland